Agnes I (c. 1090 – 29 December 1125) was Abbess of Gandersheim and Quedlinburg.

She was the second daughter of Judith of Swabia and Władysław I Herman. She was the granddaughter of Henry III, Holy Roman Emperor. Agnes became abbess at Gandersheim Abbey, the place of several famous women, such as Hroswitha of Gandersheim, recorded by Conrad Celtes.

She was Princess-Abbess of Quedlinburg from 1110 until 1125. She was excommunicated by Pope Calixtus II for her loyalty to her paternal uncle, Henry V, the King of the Romans in 1119.

She died in Quedlinburg.

References

1090s births
1125 deaths
12th-century German abbesses
Abbesses of Quedlinburg
People excommunicated by the Catholic Church
Polish princesses
Piast dynasty